Jacky Le Menn (born 17 March 1941 in Rive-de-Gier) is a former member of the Senate of France. He represented the Ille-et-Vilaine department, and is a member of the Socialist Party.

References
Page on the Senate website 

1941 births
Living people
French Senators of the Fifth Republic
Socialist Party (France) politicians
Officers of the Ordre national du Mérite
Senators of Ille-et-Vilaine
People from Rive-de-Gier